The Great California ShakeOut is an annual earthquake preparedness drill in California. It is one of the official regions in the Great ShakeOut Earthquake Drills movement. 

The first drill, known as The Great Southern California ShakeOut, took place on November 13, 2008, was the largest earthquake drill in U.S. history up until that time, and involved 5.3 million participants. The Earthquake Country Alliance organized the Great Southern California ShakeOut. 

This drill took place in homes, businesses, schools, places of worship and communities across Southern California and also featured week-long events to connect communities with preparedness resources and the information and knowledge to prepare, respond, and recover in the event of a disaster. The drill is now an annual event enlarged to cover the entire state of California. 

The Great California ShakeOut 2009 attracted 6.9 million participants. The 2010 drill occurred on October 21 and attracted 7.8 million participants.  In 2012 the drill involved 9.4 million participants, and for the first time, the drill included the region's rail system. In 2017, more than 10 million participants were involved.

References

External links 
The official ShakeOut website
United States Geological Survey
Southern California Earthquake Center (SCEC)
Earthquake Country Alliance
The full technical report for The ShakeOut Scenario
A non-technical summary narrative of the Scenario. Paper copies of the narrative are available by request.
High resolution images and a computer animation showing the earthquake rupture and its waves of energy spreading across Southern California

2008 in the United States
Disaster preparedness in the United States
History of California
2008 establishments in California
Recurring events established in 2008